General elections were held in Cambodia on 27 July 2008. The result was a victory for the ruling Cambodian People's Party, which won 90 of the 123 seats.

Background
Prime Minister Hun Sen announced the planned date of the elections on 30 May 2007, saying that the date of 27 July 2008 had been decided on because it was a holiday and because it fell exactly five years after the previous elections. While the ruling Cambodian People's Party was expected to retain its majority, FUNCINPEC was considered likely to fall behind the two major opposition parties, the Sam Rainsy Party and the Sangkum Jatiniyum Front Party. The newly founded Human Rights Party was also expected to make an impact.

Campaign
By the deadline of 12 May 2008, only twelve parties had registered for the elections, only half of the 23 parties which contested the 2003 elections and a third of the 39 in the 1998 elections. Ten of those parties fielded candidates in all of Cambodia's 24 provinces and municipalities, while the remaining two fielded candidates in only nine and seven provinces, respectively. Ten parties were approved, one was asked to submit more documents and subsequently approved and one was denied registration.

In early July, the Khmer Anti-Poverty Party and the Society of Justice Party decided to form a political alliance, and the Khmer Republican Party also stated it was willing to make alliances.

Conduct
The EU observing mission stated that based on the provisional results, the lead of the CPP was so large that there would have to be very large-scale fraud in order to call the CPP's victory into question. They still criticised the disenfranchisement of a large number of voters, but lauded the improvement over the 2003 elections; on the whole, however, the election fell short of international standards.

Results
Preliminary results from CPP sources indicated that the CPP had won 58.3% of the vote and 91 seats, whilst the SRP had won 21.9% of the vote and 26 seats, with the Human Rights Party on three seats, the NRP on two and FUNCINPEC with one. NGOs and other supervising bodies stated that the distribution was more likely 70 for CPP and 50 for SRP.

Aftermath
Prime Minister Hun Sen claimed victory the day after the elections, The stand-off with Thailand over the Preah Vihear Temple was widely seen as a successful attempt of the ruling CPP to garner more support. Analysts expected the CPP to increase its majority; as the constitution was amended to remove the need for a two-thirds majority to govern, requiring the more common simple majority instead, it was considered likely that the CPP would be able to govern without a coalition partner.

The CPP announced it would retain its coalition with the severely diminished FUNCINPEC, but ordered its leaders Keo Puth Rasmey and his wife Princess Arun Rasmey to stand down and let army general Nhek Bun Chhay take over; he would be the first non-royal to lead FUNCINPEC.

The SRP, HRP and NRP threatened to boycott the first parliamentary session unless the irregularities were investigated; the PM replied that in that case, the opposition's seats would be redistributed between CPP and FUNCINPEC.

References

Elections in Cambodia
Cambodia
Parliamentary election
2008 election